Nichols Grove is an unincorporated community in Holt County, in the U.S. state of Missouri.

The community derives its name from the Nickols family of pioneer citizens.

References

Unincorporated communities in Holt County, Missouri
Unincorporated communities in Missouri